St. Elizabeth's Church of the Catholic Third Order of Saint Francis is a Gothic church in Wrocław, Poland. It is one of the most iconic structures of the city's Old Town panorama.

Between 1525 and 1945, it was the principal Protestant church in Breslau.

History
The structure dates back to the 14th century, when construction was commissioned by the city. The main tower was originally 130 meters tall. From 1525 until 1946, St. Elizabeth's was the chief Lutheran Church of Breslau and Silesia and the principal congregation of the Evangelical Church of Prussia in Breslau. The last sermon in German was given on June 30, 1946, paying tribute to the loss of home.

In 1946 it was expropriated and given to the Military Chaplaincy of the Polish Roman Catholic Church. The church was damaged by heavy hail in 1529, and gutted by fire in 1976. The church's renowned organ was destroyed. The reconstructed main tower is now 91.5 meters tall. An observation deck near the top is open to the public. Since 1999 there is a memorial on the church property to Pastor Dietrich Bonhoeffer, a native of the city (then Breslau, Germany) and martyr to the anti-Nazi Cause.

Gallery

See also 
 List of tallest churches

References

External links 
 Bazylika św. Elżbiety - Elisabethkirche, Kościół Garnizonowy na portalu polska-org.pl 

Churches in Wrocław
Minor basilicas in Poland
Buildings and structures completed in the 14th century